In general topology, a subset of a topological space is perfect if it is closed and has no isolated points.

Note that the term perfect space is also used, incompatibly, to refer to other properties of a topological space, such as being a Gδ space.  As another possible source of confusion, also note that having the perfect set property is not the same as being a perfect set.

Examples

Examples of perfect subsets of the real line  are the empty set, all closed intervals, the real line itself, and the Cantor set. The latter is noteworthy in that it is totally disconnected.

Whether a set is perfect or not (and whether it is closed or not) depends on the surrounding space. For instance, the set  is perfect as a subset of the space  but not perfect as a subset of the space .

Connection with other topological properties 

Every topological space can be written in a unique way as the disjoint union of a perfect set and a scattered set.

Cantor proved that every closed subset of the real line can be uniquely written as the disjoint union of a perfect set and a countable set.  This is also true more generally for all closed subsets of Polish spaces, in which case the theorem is known as the Cantor–Bendixson theorem.

Cantor also showed that every non-empty perfect subset of the real line has cardinality , the cardinality of the continuum. These results are extended in  descriptive set theory as follows:
 If X is a complete metric space with no isolated points, then the Cantor space 2ω can be continuously embedded into X. Thus X has cardinality at least . If X is a separable, complete metric space with no isolated points, the cardinality of X is exactly .  
 If X is a locally compact Hausdorff space with no isolated points, there is an injective function (not necessarily continuous) from Cantor space to X, and so X has cardinality at least .

See also
Dense-in-itself
Finite intersection property
Subspace topology

Notes

References 
 Engelking, Ryszard, General Topology, Heldermann Verlag Berlin, 1989. 
 
 
 

Topology
Properties of topological spaces